Tremaine Emory is an American designer and creative consultant. He is the founder of clothing brand Denim Tears and the current creative director of Supreme.

Emory has worked as a creative consultant for publications such as The Face, brands such as Stüssy, Off-White and YEEZY as well as collaborating with some of the most influential figures in art, music and fashion including Frank Ocean, André 3000, Virgil Abloh, Tom Sachs, Theaster Gates and Hank Willis Thomas.

Personal life 
Emory was born in Atlanta, Georgia and raised in Jamaica, Queens, New York.

Career 
In 2010, Emory moved to London, United Kingdom to work for Marc Jacobs. Emory served as creative consultant and brand director for Kanye West from 2016 to 2018.

Emory founded clothing label, Denim Tears, in 2019. The first collection released on the 400th anniversary of slavery. The collection explored the history of cotton and slavery in America. The clothing featured floral wreath prints on the denim jeans, hoodies, and sweatshirts. In February 2022, Emory was appointed as creative director for Supreme.

References 

Living people
Year of birth missing (living people)
American fashion designers
American fashion businesspeople